Phyllonorycter hibiscola is a moth of the family Gracillariidae. It is found in western Kenya in primary Guineo-Congolian rain forest.

The length of the forewings is 2.1–2.4 mm. The forewings are elongate and the ground colour is golden brownish with dirty white markings. The hindwings are narrow, elongate and pointed and the ground colour is brownish fuscous. Adults are on wing from late March to mid-April.

The larvae feed as leaf miners on Hibiscus calyphyllus.  The mine has the form of a semi-transparent blotch, which is made on the underside of the leaf. The frass is fine and black and scattered at one end of mine.

Etymology
The specific name is made combining the generic name of the host plant Hibiscus with the Latin suffix -cola (meaning inhabitant).

References

Endemic moths of Kenya
Moths described in 2012
hibiscola
Moths of Africa

Taxa named by Jurate de Prins
Leaf miners